Cemetery Circuit is a temporary motorcycle street racetrack in downtown Wanganui, New Zealand, so named because the route bisects the old town cemetery. The daylong meeting has traditionally been held on Boxing Day (26 December) since 1951. The event attracts around 10,000 spectators and some of the best New Zealand motorbike racers to compete on the tight one-mile street circuit. It has earned a nickname: “Southern Hemisphere’s Isle of Man”.

References

External links
Official Website
Exhibition celebrates motorcycle racing heritage
Cemetery Circuit, 2007

Sports venues in Manawatū-Whanganui
Sport in Whanganui
Motorsport venues in New Zealand